Peter Hercules Wendover (August 1, 1768 – September 24, 1834) was a United States Representative from New York.

Biography
Born in New York City, Wendover received a liberal schooling and held several local offices. He was a member of the volunteer fire department of New York City in 1796. He served as delegate to the State constitutional conventions in 1801 and 1821 and was a member of the New York State Assembly in 1804.

Wendover was elected as a Democratic-Republican to the Fourteenth, Fifteenth, and Sixteenth Congresses (March 4, 1815 – March 3, 1821). Afterward, he served as the Sheriff of New York County, New York, from 1822 to 1825.

He died in New York City on September 24, 1834, and was buried in the Dutch Reformed Church Cemetery.

References
 

1768 births
1834 deaths
American people of Dutch descent
Members of the New York State Assembly
Sheriffs of New York County, New York
Democratic-Republican Party members of the United States House of Representatives from New York (state)